Bayou Pigeon is a small unincorporated community Cajun village located near the southern extremities of Iberville Parish, Louisiana, United States. The hamlet is primarily composed of fishermen and plant workers. A great majority of the village's population are of Cajun descent.

History
Many of the residents trace their lineage back to Pierre Part, a town in nearby Assumption Parish. Cajun French can still be heard in most of the older residents' homes.  Some have been noted to having used Cajun French as their sole language even as late as the early 2000s.

Geography
It is bordered by the Atchafalaya Basin on the west, Louisiana Highway 404 to the north, White Castle Canal on the east, and Iberia Parish to the south.

The main thoroughfare is Louisiana Highway 75. There is one bridge across the Grand River near the Catholic Church. It was erected in 1957. Hwy. 75 terminates on the east bank of the Grand River in Bayou Pigeon at a location dubbed "The End of the World."

Demographics
Catholicism is the predominant faith, and the only church was St. Joan of Arc Catholic Church, closed November 24th, 2017. Despite the predominance of Roman Catholicism, there was a Southern Baptist congregation in the village from the 1960s to the late 1980s, known as Bayou Pigeon Baptist Church and led by Rev. George W. Ray (1912–1992).

Media
The village was also featured on the Discovery Channel show "Dirty Jobs" in an episode profiling the work of a local crawfisher, and also on the History Channel show "Swamp People".  It is also featured in Country Music Television's Swamp Pawn show.

Education
Iberville Parish Library operates the Bayou Pigeon Branch.

References

Unincorporated communities in Louisiana
Unincorporated communities in Iberville Parish, Louisiana
Baton Rouge metropolitan area